Loliolus Japonica, the Japanese squid, is a species of squid from the family Loliginidae. As the name suggests, it lives around Japan, but has also been found around Vietnam and China. They are pelagic, living 1–30 meters down in the ocean.

The Japanese squid has light tan skin, with speckles all over its mantle and tentacles. It has a particularly large mantle, and an unusually wide fin along the mantle as well. It has dark, black eyes. Females are larger than males. The maximum length a male can get is 12 centimeters. Loliolus japonica are nonbioluminescent species which means that they do not emit light. 

A male will perform various rituals to get a female's attention, and after that they will mate. Embryos will hatch into a planktonic stage for a fair amount of time, but will then turn into adults. Males and females die after spawning.

References

Squid